Gerrit is a Dutch male name meaning "brave with the spear", the Dutch and Frisian form of Gerard. People with this name include:
 Gerrit Achterberg (1905–1962), Dutch poet
 Gerrit van Arkel (1858–1918), Dutch architect
 Gerrit Badenhorst (born 1962), South African powerlifter and professional strongman competitor
 Gerrit Battem (c. 1636 – 1684), Dutch landscape painter
 Gerrit Beneker (1882–1934), American painter and illustrator 
 Gerrit Berckheyde (1638–1698), Dutch painter
 Gerrit Berkhoff (1901–1996), Dutch chemist and university rector
 Gerrit Cornelis Berkouwer (1903–1996), Dutch theologian
 Gerrit Berveling (born 1944), Dutch Esperanto author
 Gerrit Blaauw (born 1924), Dutch computer engineer
 Gerrit de Blanken (1894–1961), Dutch pottery artist
 Gerrit van Bloclant (1578–1650), Dutch Renaissance painter
 Gerrit Bol (1906–1989), Dutch mathematician
 Gerrit Braamcamp (1699–1771), Dutch distiller, timber merchant and art collector 
 Gerrit den Braber (1929–1997), Dutch songwriter and lyricist
 Gerrit Broekstra (born 1941), Dutch scientist and professor
 Gerrit Cole (born 1990), American baseball pitcher
 Gerrit Gerritsz Cuyp (c. 1565–1644), Dutch painter and stained glass artist
 Gerrit J. Diekema (1859–1930), American politician
 Gerrit van Dijk (1938–2012), Dutch animator, film maker, actor and painter
 Gerrit Dou (1613–1675), Dutch painter
 Gerrit L. Dox (1784–1847), American politician
 Gerrit Faulhaber (1912–1951), Dutch-Indonesian footballer
 Gerrit Fauser (born 1989), German ice hockey player
 Gerrit Ferreira (born 1948), South African businessman 
 Gerrit Fischer (1916–1984), Dutch footballer 
 Gerrit Fokkema (born 1954), Australian photographer
 Gerrit Forbes (1836–1906), American judge 
 Gerrit De Geest (born 1960), Belgian legal scholar 
 Gerrit van Gelderen (1926–1994), Dutch-born Irish naturalist, wildlife broadcaster, film-maker, illustrator and cartoonist
 Gerrit Van Gestel (born 1958), Belgian former cyclist
 Gerrit Glas (born 1954), Dutch philosopher and psychiatrist 
 Gerrit Glomser (born 1975), Austrian racing cyclist
 Gerrit David Gratama (1874–1965), Dutch artist, writer and museum director
 Gerrit Govaars (1866–1954), Dutch teacher and Salvation Army officer
 Gerrit Graham (born 1949), American actor and songwriter
 Gerrit Holdijk (1944–2015), Dutch politician
 Gerrit Holtmann (born 1995), German footballer
 Gerrit van Houten (1866–1934), Dutch painter and artist
 Gerrit van Iterson (1878–1972), Dutch botanist and professor
 Gerrit de Jager (born 1954), Dutch cartoonist
 Gerrit de Jong Jr. (1892–1978), Dutch-born American art teacher, pedagogue and professor
 Gerrit Kastein (1910–1943), Dutch communist, neurologist and WWII resistance fighter
 Gerrit Hendrik Kersten (1882–1948), Dutch Christian minister and politician
 Gerrit Kleerekoper (1897–1943), Dutch gymnastics coach
 Gerrit Komrij (1944–2012), Dutch poet
 Gerrit Korteweg (born 1937), Dutch swimmer
 Gerrit Kouwenaar (1923–2014), Dutch journalist, translator, poet and prose writer
 Gerrit Krol (1934−2013), Dutch author, essayist and writer
 Gerrit Kruize (1923–2009), American field hockey player 
 Ger Lagendijk (1941–2010), Dutch footballer
 Gerrit Lamberts (1776–1850), Dutch painter and museum curator 
 Gerrit Y. Lansing (1783–1862), American politician
 Gerrit Lekkerkerker (1922–1999), Dutch mathematician
 Gerrit Lundens (1622–1683), Dutch painter 
 Gerrit Maus (born 1981), German vision scientist
 Gerrit van der Meer (born 1950), Dutch television producer, film producer and unit production manager
 Gerrit Nauber (born 1992), German footballer
 Gerrit Niekoop (born 1934), Surinamese football player
 Gerrit Noordzij (born 1931), Dutch typographer, typeface designer, and author
 Gerrit Olivier (born 19??), South African academic and diplomat
 Gerrit Oosting (1941–2012), Dutch politician
 Gerrit Opperman (born 1945), South African Army General
 Gerrit Paape (1752–1803), Dutch earthenware and stoneware painter, poet, journalist, novelist, judge, columnist and civil servant
 Gerrit Patist (1947–2005), Dutch sculptor and ceramist
 Gerrit Pels (1893–1966), Dutch astronomer
 Gerrit Plomp (born 1963), Dutch footballer
 Gerrit van Poelje (1884–1976), founder of Public Administration in the Netherlands
 Gerrit Pressel (born 1990), German footballer
 Gerrit Radstaak (1914–1996), Canadian politician
 Gerrit Reynst (1599–1658), Dutch merchant and art collector 
 Gerrit Rietveld (1888–1964), Dutch architect 
 Gerrit Roos (1898–1969), Dutch weightlifter
 Gerrit Rudolph (born 1988), South African-born Namibian cricketer
 Gerrit van Santen (1591/92–1656), Dutch painter and writer
 Gerrit Schimmelpenninck (1794–1863), Dutch businessman and statesman
 Gerrit Schipper (c. 1775 – c. 1832), Dutch painter 
 Gerrit Schotte (born 1974), Curaçao optician
 Gerrit Schouten (1779–1839), Surinamese artist
 Gerrit Schulte (1916–1992), Dutch track bicycle racer
 Gerrit Smith (1797–1874), American abolitionist
 Gerrit van Spaan (1654–1711), Dutch writer 
 Gerrit Stoeten (born 1986), Spanish footballer
 Gerrit T. Thorn (1835–1900), American politician
 Gerrit Friedrich Otto Toennies (1898-1978), research biochemist
 Gerrit van Uylenburgh (c. 1625 – 1679), Dutch painter and art-dealer
 Gerrit van der Veen (1902–1944), Dutch sculptor and member of the Dutch Resistance in WWII
 Gerrit de Veer (c. 1570 – after 1598), Dutch military officer and explorer 
 Gerrit Verschuur (born 1937), South African-born American scientist
 Gerrit Viljoen (1926–2009), South African politician
 Gerrit Cornelisz Vlasman (before 1600–after 1624), Dutch brewer 
 Gerrit van Voorst (1910–1986), Dutch swimmer 
 Gerrit de Vries (politician) (1818–1900), Dutch jurist and politician, former Prime Minister of the Netherlands 
 Gerrit de Vries (cyclist) (born 1967), road racing cyclist
 Gerrit van Wees (1913–1995), Dutch cyclist 
 Gerrit de Wet (1616–1674), Dutch painter
 Gerrit Zalm (born 1952), Dutch politician 
 Gerrit Zegelaar (1719–1794), Dutch painter

Dutch masculine given names